The 2013–14 Idaho Vandals women's basketball team represented the University of Idaho during the 2013–14 NCAA Division I women's basketball season. The Vandals, led by sixth year head coach Jon Newlee, played their home games at the Cowan Spectrum and were members of the Western Athletic Conference. It was Idaho's final season in the WAC as they will join the Big Sky Conference for the 2014–15 season. The Vandals would win the WAC championship and participate in the NCAA Tournament.

Roster

Schedule
Source

|-
!colspan=9 style="background:#B18E5F; color:#000000;"| Regular Season

|-
!colspan=9 style="background:#9F9D9D; color:#000000;"| WAC tournament

|-
!colspan=9 style="background:#9F9D9D; color:#000000;"| NCAA tournament

See also
2013–14 Idaho Vandals men's basketball team

References

Idaho
Idaho Vandals women's basketball seasons
Idaho
Idaho Vandals women's b
Idaho Vandals women's b